The BMJ is a medical journal, formerly known as the British Medical Journal

Related uses include:
BMJ (company), which publishes The BMJ
BMJ Open, open access journal
Student BMJ, student journal

BMJ may also refer to:
The German Federal Ministry of Justice (Bundesministerium der Justiz), now the Federal Ministry of Justice and Consumer Protection
Bote-Darai language (ISO 639:bmj)
Baramita Airport in Baramita, Guyana (IATA airport code BMJ)
Bemidji Airlines (ICAO airline code BMJ)
Barbican Mission to the Jews, organisation which became Christian Witness to Israel